Helicia excelsa is a plant in the family Proteaceae. The bark is dark grey to blackish. Inflorescences bear up to three reddish brown flowers. The specific epithet excelsa is from the Latin meaning "lofty", referring to the tree's growth. Habitat is forests from sea level to  altitude. H. excelsa is found in Bangladesh, Burma, Thailand, Malaysia and Indonesia.

References

excelsa
Plants described in 1834
Trees of Bangladesh
Trees of Myanmar
Trees of Thailand
Trees of Peninsular Malaysia
Trees of Sumatra
Trees of Borneo